The DR Congo national football team, recognised by FIFA as Congo DR (formerly known as Zaire, alternatively known as Congo-Kinshasa), represents the Democratic Republic of the Congo in men's international football and it is controlled by the Congolese Association Football Federation. They are nicknamed the Leopards. The team is a member of FIFA and the Confederation of African Football (CAF).

Congo DR have been ranked as high as 28th in the FIFA Rankings. As Zaire they were the first Sub-Saharan African team to qualify for the FIFA World Cup and twice won the Africa Cup of Nations.

History

Early history
The Congolese Association Football Federation was founded in 1919 when the country was not independent. The team played their first game in 1948 as Belgian Congo against Northern Rhodesia, now Zambia. The team recorded a 3–2 victory at home. DR Congo has been FIFA affiliated since 1962 and has been a member of CAF since 1963. The team's first official match was on 11 April 1963, against Mauritania in the L'Amitié Tournament played in Dakar, Senegal. DR Congo won the match 6–0. The national team appeared in the Africa Cup of Nations for the first time in 1965.

Glory period
The Democratic Republic of the Congo had its first international success at the 1968 African Cup of Nations held in Ethiopia, beating Ghana 1–0 in the final. The team's biggest ever win came on 22 November 1969 when they recorded a 10–1 home victory against Zambia. Although a handful of Congolese players were playing in Europe (particularly Belgium) during these years, foreign-based players were seldom recalled for international duty; a rare exception was Julien Kialunda who represented Zaire (as the country was by then known) at the 1972 African Cup of Nations while playing for Anderlecht.

The second continental title came at the 1974 African Cup of Nations in Egypt. The Leopards recorded a 2–1 victory against Guinea, another 2–1 victory against rivals Congo and a 4–1 victory against Mauritius. These results carried Zaire through to the semi-finals where they beat hosts Egypt 3–2. In the final, Zaire drew with Zambia 2–2. Therefore, the match was replayed two days later, where Zaire won the game 2–0. Zaire player Ndaye Mulamba was top scorer with nine goals, which remains a record for the tournament. After this, the team returned to Zaire on the Presidential plane, lent to them by Mobutu Sese Seko.

Zaire were the first Sub-Saharan African team to participate in a World Cup, qualifying for the 1974 tournament in place of the 1970 participant Morocco, whom they defeated in the decisive qualifier 3–0 in Kinshasa. Such was the desire to foster an identity of Zaire as a global player that Mobutu paid for advertising hoardings at the World Cup to display messages such as ‘Zaire-Peace’ and ‘Go to Zaire’. At the tournament itself, Zaire did not manage to score any goals and lost all of its games, but gave credible performances against Scotland and Brazil. However, their 9–0 loss against Yugoslavia remains one of the worst World Cup defeats. A bizarre moment came in the match versus Brazil; facing a free-kick 25 yards out, defender Mwepu Ilunga, upon hearing the referee blow his whistle, ran out of the Zaire wall and kicked the ball upfield, for which he received a yellow card. This was voted the 17th greatest World Cup moment in a Channel 4 poll. Ilunga has stated that he was quite aware of the rules and was hoping to convince the referee to send him off. The intended red card would have been a protest against his country's authorities, who were alleged to be depriving the players of their earnings. Many contemporary commentators instead held it to be an example of African football's "naïvety and indiscipline".

Crisis period

After winning the 1974 African Cup of Nations and participating in the 1974 World Cup, the team was eliminated in the first round of the 1976 African Cup of Nations after recording a draw and two losses in the group stage. Morocco went on to win the tournament. From 1978 to 1986, the country did not qualify for the African Cup of Nations, while not participating in qualification for the 1978 World Cup and 1986 World Cup. In the 1988 African Cup of Nations, Zaire finished last in their group despite having two draws.

Return to success
From 1992 to 1996, Zaire, reached three consecutive African Cup of Nations quarter-finals. In 1992 and 1994, they were beaten by Nigeria, and in 1996 they were beaten by Ghana. In 1997, the country returned to its former name of Democratic Republic of the Congo, and the national team was re-branded as the Simbas, a nickname that stuck for the next nine years. DR Congo played their first game on 8 June 1997 in Pointe-Noire which ended in a 1–0 loss to the Republic of the Congo. At the 1998 African Cup of Nations, DR Congo, led by Louis Watunda, surprisingly took third place, beating Cameroon in the quarter-finals and hosts Burkina Faso 4–1 on penalties in their last match after scoring three late goals to tie the encounter 4–4.

At the 2000 African Cup of Nations, the team finished third in their group, and in 2002 were eliminated in the quarter-finals by Senegal. Then, in 2004, DR Congo were eliminated after three straight defeats in the group stages. In 2006, led by Claude Le Roy, having finished second in the group behind Cameroon, the Congolese were eliminated in the quarter-finals by Egypt 4–1.

Struggles
DR Congo were drawn in group 10 for qualifications for the 2008 African Cup of Nations, along with Libya, Namibia and Ethiopia. Before the last match day, the Congolese led the group, but they drew 1–1 with Libya in their final match while Namibia beat Ethiopia 3–2. This sent Namibia through to the Finals, while the Leopards were eliminated. DR Congo also failed to qualify for the 2010 World Cup. In 2009, DR Congo won the 2009 African Championship of Nations, a competition reserved to players in domestic leagues, a tournament they would again win in 2016. DR Congo reached the 2013 Africa Cup of Nations finals in South Africa but were knocked out in the group stages after drawing all three matches.

The Ibengé era: rise and near World Cup miss
In the 2015 Africa Cup of Nations, DR Congo again drew all three group matches but this time finished second in the group behind Tunisia, and therefore advanced to the quarter-finals to play their rivals Republic of Congo, a match in which the Leopards came from two goals down to win 4–2. However, they were knocked out by the Ivory Coast 3–1 in the semi-finals. They ended up finishing third, beating Equatorial Guinea on penalties, after the third place match finished 0–0 in regulation time.

DR Congo under Ibengé improved radically and had an outstanding performance for many decades in a World Cup qualification. During the 2018 FIFA World Cup qualification, DR Congo was grouped with Libya, Tunisia and Guinea. DR Congo managed an outstanding performance, beating Libya and Guinea home and away, but missed the chance after losing 1–2 to eventual World Cup qualifier Tunisia in Tunis and drew 2–2 at home to the same opponent.

Recent schedule and results

The following is a list of match results from the previous 12 months, as well as any future matches that have been scheduled.

2022

2023

Coaches

  Léon Mokuna (1965)
  Ferenc Csanádi (1967–1968)
  Léon Mokuna (1968–1970)
  André Mori (1970)
  Blagoje Vidinić (1970–1974)
  Ştefan Stănculescu (1974–1976)
  Julien Kialunda (?–?)
  Otto Pfister (1985–1989)
  Ali Makombo Alamande (1989)
  Pierre Kalala Mukendi (1992–1993)
  Louis Watunda (1993)
  Pierre Kalala Mukendi (1994)
  Jean-Santos Muntubila (1995)
  Muhsin Ertuğral (1995–1996)
  Jean-Santos Muntubila (1996–1997)
  Mohamed Magassouba (1997)
  Celio Barros (1997)
  Saio Ernest Mokili (1997)
  Georges Leekens (1997)
  Louis Watunda Iyolo (1998–1999)
  Médard Lusadusu Basilwa (1999–2000)
  Roger Palmgren (1999–2000)
  Mohamed Magassouba (2000)
  Jean-Santos Muntubila (2001)
  Yuri Gavrilov (2001) 
  Eugène Kabongo (2002)
  Andy Magloire Mfutila (2002–2003)
  Mick Wadsworth (2003–2004)
  Claude Le Roy (2004–2006)
  Henri Depireux (2006–2007)
  Patrice Neveu (2008–2010)
  Robert Nouzaret (2010–2011)
  Claude Le Roy (2011–2013)
  Jean-Santos Muntubila (2013–2014)
  Florent Ibengé (2014–2019)
  Christian Nsengi-Biembe (2019–2021)
  Héctor Cúper (2021–2022)
  Sébastien Desabre (2022–present)

Players

Current squad
The following players have been selected for the 2023 Africa Cup of Nations qualification matches against Mauritania on 24 and 29 March 2022 respectively.

Caps and goals as of 27 September 2022, after the match against Sierra Leone.

Recent call-ups
The following players have also been called up for DR Congo in the last twelve months and are still eligible to represent.

INJ Player withdrew from the squad due to an injury.
PRE Preliminary squad.
RET Player has retired from international football.
SUS Suspended from the national team.

Records

Players in bold are still active with DR Congo.

Most appearances

Top goalscorers

Competitive record

FIFA World Cup

Africa Cup of Nations

African Nations Championship record

African Games

Head-to-head record
Updated as for 1 February 2022.

References

External links

 Sport actualité Congo Democratic Republic
 
 Leopardsfoot

 
African national association football teams
D
National sports teams of the Democratic Republic of the Congo